Gadibidi Ganda is a Kannada film released in 1993, directed by V. S. Reddy. This film stars Ravichandran, Ramya Krishnan and Roja (in her Kannada debut), amongst others. Music and lyrics was composed by Hamsalekha. The film was produced by K. Krishna Mohana Rao. It was a remake of Telugu movie Allari Mogudu, starring Mohan Babu.

Synopsis
Gopal is a village boy with a melodious voice who comes to the city in search of a job. Mohana a young and vibrant girl helps him to get a break in a good music company. In this process Mohana falls in love with him and forces him to marry her. On the other hand, Gopal returns to his village and marries his childhood love Nilambari. How would he juggle between both his wives makes the comedy climax of the story.

Cast
 Ravichandran as Gopal
 Ramya Krishna as Mohana
 Roja as Neelambari
 Nagesh
 Jaggesh as Sathya, Gopal's friend
 Doddanna as Mohana's father
 J V Somayajulu as Neelambari's father

Songs

Reception
The film and music composed by Hamsalekha was well received.

References

1990s Kannada-language films
1993 films
Films scored by Hamsalekha
Kannada remakes of Telugu films
Polygamy in fiction
Indian romantic comedy films
1993 romantic comedy films